Ronald Wayne Cook (born July 11, 1947 in Jefferson, Texas), is a former Major League Baseball pitcher who played for the Houston Astros in 1970 and 1971.

Baseball career
Cook graduated from Longview High School. He was signed by the New York Yankees in 1966 as an amateur free agent and originally played the outfield before being converted to pitching in 1968.

External links
, or Retrosheet, or Pura Pelota

1947 births
Living people
Baseball players from Texas
Binghamton Triplets players
Columbus Astros players
Cardenales de Lara players
American expatriate baseball players in Venezuela
Denver Bears players
Florida Instructional League Astros players
Florida Instructional League Yankees players
Fort Lauderdale Yankees players
Houston Astros players
Johnson City Yankees players
Major League Baseball pitchers
Oklahoma City 89ers players
Oneonta Yankees players
People from Jefferson, Texas
Tigres de Aragua players
Kilgore College alumni